The Preventive Penal Law Against Communism was a Guatemalan decree passed by the military junta of Carlos Castillo Armas on 24 August 1954. The decree was preceded by the formation of the National Committee of Defense Against Communism. The Preventive Penal Law Against Communism officially prohibited any kind of communist activity and established a blacklist of active communists.

Around 70,000 Guatemalans engaging or suspected of engaging in communist activities were blacklisted under the law. Another 8,000 were arrested, and an estimated 8,000-10,000 were forced into exile. This decree was also used to suspend habeas corpus.

References

See also
 1954 Guatemalan coup d'état

1954 in law
Anti-communism in Guatemala
Cold War
Political and cultural purges
Political repression in Guatemala